The Royal Banana Monopoly (RAMB) was a state-owned enterprise founded in Mogadishu in 1935, to transport and market bananas harvested in Italian Somalia throughout the rest of the Italian Empire, directly under the control of the Colonial Ministry. Even if the last transport of bananas to Italy happened in early 1940, it survived the first years of WW2 – and officially lasted until 1946.

History

When the price of cotton plummeted after 1929, bananas became the most profitable crop in the empire. The RAMB had a small fleet of seven ships, including four newly commissioned banana boats which transported bananas quickly from the Horn of Africa to Europe. The RAMB worked directly with Italian banana producers in Giuba and Genale, who were represented by the Federation of Banana Growers of Somalia (FEBAS).

In 1939, were transported 450000 tn of bananas to Italy by the four RAMB ships ("Ramb I, "Ramb II", "Ramb III","Ramb IV") and 3 other cargo ships (the "Capitan Cecchi", the "Capitan Bottego" and the "Duca degli Abruzzi").

Following Italy's entry into World War II, the banana boats were reclassified for naval use and saw service off the coast of Africa and in the Mediterranean.  Of its seven ships, only Ramb III survived the war and was converted to a personal yacht for Josip Broz Tito, president of SFR Yugoslavia.

After Italy regained administrative control of Somalia in 1950, the government reactivated the Banana Monopoly as the Azienda Monopolio Banana (AMB) with the intent of revitalizing the heavily damaged agricultural industry. The AMB continued to regulate the price and marketing of bananas in Somalia until its dissolution in 1964, four years after the country gained independence.

Fleet

References

Bibliography
 Guida dell'Africa Orientale, C.T.I., Milano 1938.
 Calendario Atlante De Agostini, Novara 1960.
 Banane Fasciste: breve storia della banana italica ai tempi dell'autarchia, Sergio Salvi, Affinità Elettive ed., Ancona 2018.

Italian Somaliland
Banana production
Government-owned companies of Italy
Italian companies established in 1935
Agriculture companies of Italy
1935 establishments in Italian Somaliland
Defunct companies of Somalia
Companies based in Mogadishu